Carl Auteried (14 December 1914 – 1998) was an Austrian sailor. He competed in the Flying Dutchman event at the 1960 Summer Olympics.

References

External links
 

1914 births
1998 deaths
Austrian male sailors (sport)
Olympic sailors of Austria
Sailors at the 1960 Summer Olympics – Flying Dutchman
Sportspeople from Vienna